Oliver Cromwell Dawson (September 7, 1910 – February 9, 1989) was an American athlete and sports coach. After playing several sports at John Carroll University, he served as a coach and athletic director for the South Carolina State Bulldogs from 1935 to 1976. The Bulldogs' Oliver C. Dawson Stadium is named in his honor.

Early life and education
Dawson was born on September 7, 1910. He grew up in Ohio and attended Collinwood High School, where he played several sports. He played at fullback in football for three seasons, at guard in basketball as a starter for three years, and participated in several track and field events. He led his basketball teams to undefeated records in all three seasons and in track and field set a state record in the 440-yard dash. Dawson also participated in 100-yard dash events as well as the 220. He also was a boxer during this time, and once held the heavyweight champion of Cleveland.

Dawson later attended John Carroll University, where he played three years of football, two or three years of tennis, and three years of basketball. He has been called "perhaps John Carroll's most versatile star athlete of all time." Playing fullback in football, he finished with an career average of 5.5 yards-per-carry, and led the team in scoring as a junior and senior. Dawson played his last football game in November 1933.

In basketball, Dawson played guard for the 1931–32, 1932–33, and 1933–34 teams, serving as their team captain in the last. As a tennis player, he began with singles before moving on to doubles; while playing singles he ranked number one at the school. Dawson was inducted into the John Carroll University Athletic Hall of Fame in 1984, the first African-American ever to earn the honor.

Coaching career
Dawson transferred to South Carolina State College following his time at John Carroll and graduated in 1936. It was here where he coached five different sports and served as athletic director across a period that spanned from 1935 to 1976, winning championships in all but one of those sports. Dawson served as head coach for the men's basketball team, football team, golf team, track team, and tennis team, and for 16 years was director of athletics.

In football, Dawson served as the backfield coach in football from 1935 until his graduation. He was promoted to head football coach in 1937, and went on to serve in the position through 1950, besides the 1943–1945 seasons which were cancelled due to World War II. His 1947 team went undefeated and played for the black college national championship. Among notable football players he coached or recruited included Marion Motley and Deacon Jones, both of whom went on to be Pro Football Hall of Famers.

Described as being one of the most "versatile" coaches, Dawson also served as the head basketball coach from 1936 to 1947, winning the school's first ever SIAC title in 1943 in any sport. For seven years, he coached tennis, leading the team to four conference championships; among the players he coached was George Stewart, a national champion in the American Tennis Association (ATA). Dawson also coached the golf team for six seasons and led them to four conference titles. He was head athletic director for 16 years and also served as a professor at the school, initiating in 1947 the health and physical education program while serving as its chairman for 30 years. He retired from South Carolina State in 1976.

Honors and death
Dawson was inducted into the South Carolina Athletic Hall of Fame in 1974, the first black person ever to receive the honor. He was inducted into the South Carolina State Athletic Hall of Fame in 1984, as a charter member. Oliver C. Dawson Stadium, South Carolina State's home football venue, was renamed in his honor in 1984. Dawson died on February 9, 1989, at the age of 78.

Head coaching record

Football

References

Notes

Citations

External links
 

1910 births
1989 deaths
American football fullbacks
Guards (basketball)
John Carroll Blue Streaks football players
John Carroll Blue Streaks men's basketball players
South Carolina State Bulldogs football coaches
South Carolina State Bulldogs basketball coaches
College golf coaches in the United States
College men's tennis players in the United States
College tennis coaches in the United States
College track and field coaches in the United States
People from Hampton, Georgia
Coaches of American football from Ohio
Players of American football from Cleveland
Basketball players from Cleveland
Tennis people from Ohio
Track and field athletes from Ohio
African-American college athletic directors in the United States
African-American coaches of American football
African-American players of American football
African-American basketball coaches
African-American basketball players
African-American male tennis players
African-American male track and field athletes
20th-century African-American sportspeople